Viktor Nikolaevich Kibenok (17 February 1963  11 May 1986) was a Chernobyl firefighter who was posthumously awarded the title Hero of the Soviet Union after he died of radiation sickness.

Life 
Kibenok was born into a family of firefighters, his father and his grandfather were both firemen. He would sometimes go with his father to emergencies and watch. This is presumably when he found his love for firefighting. He graduated from Cherkasy Fire And Technical School in August 1984 and was sent to work in Pripyat. He was a Lieutenant and the Chief Guard at Pripyat Fire Station (SPVCH-6). 

Kibenok is described as being strong-willed, kind by-nature, a caring man. He also had a love for Motorsports and owned a motorcycle. In his free time he would modify and work on his motorcycle and loved driving it.

He was told of his wife's pregnancy just two days before the accident - the child would later die in labour.

Chernobyl Disaster 
Kibenok and his brigade were on duty at the moment of explosion. An alarm came through from Volodymyr Pravyk's brigade, requesting him to send his brigade to the power plant. Kibenok had been told that the roofs of the turbine hall and the third reactor had caught fire. He dispatched a Ural-375 AC-40, two ZIL-130 AC-40s and a ZIL-131 AL-30 mechanical ladder truck.  

Kibenok, riding in a ZIL-130, arrived on the southern side of the power plant at around 1:35 AM and his brigade briefly parked their vehicles along the turbine hall. Kibenok met with Pravyk, who told him to take his brigade to the roof of Unit 3 and extinguish the fires there, whilst his brigade extinguished the turbine hall fires. Pravyk volunteered to guide Kibenok and his men to the roof of Unit 3.  

At around 1:45 AM he ordered his ZIL-131 AL30 ladder truck to relocate to the north side of the plant in order to establish hose lines to the roof of Unit 3. Later, the Ural-375 AC-40 and one ZIL-130 AC-40 were relocated onto the north side of the power plant. The Ural was parked in front of Unit 4's transport corridor, on the train tracks, the ZIL-130 being parked to its left.  

Four men were chosen from Kibenok's brigade to climb to the third reactor's roof: Senior Sergeant Vasily Ignatenko, Senior Sergeant Vladimir Tishura, Sergeant Nikolai Vashchuk and Junior Sergeant Nikolai Titenok. Along with Pravyk, the squad of six climbed to the roof of the third reactor from the south, across the turbine hall.  

According to a later report by Leonid Telyatnikov, there were around five small fires on the roof of the third reactor, which were caused by hot pieces of nuclear material igniting the flammable bitumen roof. The roof was also strewn with red-hot graphite blocks and uranium fuel assemblies which were highly radioactive. The squad maneuvered around the roof of Unit 3 and the base of the ventilation chimney, extinguishing various small fires around the roof. The roof was that hot that the bitumen began to melt, and it stuck to Kibenok's boots, making it difficult to move.   

The radiation began to take its toll though, as at around 2:30 AM Tishura and Vashchuk reportedly collapsed on the roof. The crew began to make their way back down the ladders onto the turbine hall roof. Whilst descending from the roof of Unit 3, Kibenok apparently briefly fell unconscious and had to be assisted down the stairs by Ignatenko, who was also carrying Tishura down the staircase. The men in Pravyk's brigade who were firefighting on the roof of the turbine hall ran over to assist. Piotr Khmel, a driver of one of the fire engines from Kibenok's unit helped him take off his uniform, and stayed with Kibenok and the others until an ambulance arrived.  

In the absence of Kibenok's squad, Telyatnikov ordered three men: Zakharov and Petrovsky from CВПЧ-2 (Pravyk's brigade) to stand on firewatch on the reactor roof. Although they soon abandoned their post after Petrovsky reportedly went temporarily blind. Zakharov was reported to have said: "Fuck this! lets get out of here!". Telyatnikov then stayed on the reactor roof himself before succumbing to the early onset of ARS.  

Kibenok was taken to Sanitary Unit No.126 (the Pripyat Hospital) along with all of the other first responders and plant workers.

Hospitalization and death 
Kibenok stayed in Sanitary Unit No.126 (the Pripyat Hospital) for one day before the true scale of the accident was realized. He was then transported by air to Moscow Hospital No.6, which specialised in radiology and radiation burns. He had received bitumen burns on the inside of his mouth and his lungs were damaged by inhaling burning bitumen. Due to these internal burns, Kibenok couldn't eat and it was extremely painful for him to speak. He had also received severe thermal burns on his legs. By May 9th, Kibenok could no longer stand. He died a few days later on May 11th a few hours after his friend Pravyk. Throughout his hospitalization, he remained positive - even after multiple failed skin grafts and a failed bone-marrow transplant. His funeral was held on May 13th. 

Kibenok died at age 23. He is buried alongside his comrades in Mitinskoe Cemetery in Moscow.

Legacy 
After his death, Kibenok left behind a wife, and a child. Although the child would later be stillborn. He posthumously received the Hero of The Soviet Union award and the Ukrainian Order For Courage. He has a street named after him in his home city of Ivankov. Kibenok also has numerous monuments, all over the Kiev region, including one at the Cherkasy Fire and Technical School, where he trained to become an officer.

See also
Deaths due to the Chernobyl disaster

References

External links

 
1963 births 
1986 deaths 
People from Kherson Oblast
Heroes of the Soviet Union
Chernobyl liquidators
Ukrainian firefighters
Soviet firefighters
Chevaliers of the Order For Courage
Victims of radiological poisoning